Edwin Adams may refer to:

 Edwin Adams (actor) (1834–1877), American stage actor
 Edwin Adams (politician) (1829–1908), mayor of Norwalk, Connecticut
 Edwin Plimpton Adams (1878–1956), American physicist